(Miyako: Irav), is an island in Miyakojima, Okinawa Prefecture, Japan. The island is connected to Miyako Island by a  bridge , which was completed in January 2015. Irabu Island is also connected via six bridges to Shimoji-shima. There are multiple language variants spoken on the island: Nakachi-Irabu, Kuninaka, Sawada-Nakahama, and Sarahama (which is a variant of Ikema language spoken by descendants of emigrants from Ikema Island).

Climate

See also

 Shimoji Island
 Ikema Island
 Miyako Island

References

Islands of Okinawa Prefecture
Miyako Islands